Adetaptera insularis is a species of beetle in the family Cerambycidae. It was described by Fisher in 1930.

References

Apomecynini
Beetles described in 1930